The Moncton Public Library in Moncton, New Brunswick, Canada, aims to meet the educational, cultural, informational and recreational needs of its users. The Moncton Public Library provides access to a province-wide collection of more than 1.8 million items, 116,000 of which are on its shelves.

History
The Moncton Public Library was founded in 1913. It was made possible thanks to the efforts of the Fort Cumberland Chapter of the IODE which started working on the project as early as 1911. The library was originally opened in the old City Hall and was destroyed by fire on February 25, 1914. Afterwards, it was moved to the Higgins Block, which is located on the corner of Main Street and Botsford Street.  On February 27, 1927, the library was moved to Archibald House, which burned down on March 2, 1948.

After the fire, the Moncton Public Library was moved to Kirby House, located at 51 Highfield Street, where it was officially reopened on January 20, 1949. This building was demolished in October 1961 in order to build a new one for the library on the same land; it was inaugurated on September 22, 1962. The Moncton Public Library is currently located in the Blue Cross Centre where it has been since 1989. The library's previous location on Highfield Street was renovated to accommodate office space in 1991.

On July 13, 2012, a statue of former Moncton resident Northrop Frye was unveiled in front of the library. It was created by artists Darren Byers and Fred Harrison.

Naming

In 1998 the City of Moncton's name bank committee suggested that the Moncton Public Library change its name to the Northrop Frye Library to honour the acclaimed literary critic Northrop Frye, who lived in Moncton during his early years. However, the library board of the time disagreed on the grounds that though Frye had a great international reputation and was a renowned and celebrated philosopher and critic, he had "done nothing for the Moncton Public Library itself". The board was also concerned that, if the library were to become the Northrop Frye Library, citizens might get the impression that the public library was instead an archive dedicated to Frye and his works. In order to honour this famous Monctonian, the library instead chose to name a meeting room after him.

Collections 
 Book collection includes bestsellers, fiction and non-fiction for a wide variety of research and recreational purposes as well as large-print books, audiobooks, music, DVDs and videos, magazines, language kits, adult literacy materials, talking books for the visually and/or physically challenged and braille books for children.
 E-books and audiobooks can also be borrowed via the Electronic Library New Brunswick with a New Brunswick Library card.
 Microfilm archive includes Moncton and area newspapers dating back to the late 18th century, census information, and telephone directories.
 Heritage room archive includes local historical and genealogical books and works by authors from the Albert/Westmoreland/Kent area.
 A number of items related to Northrop Frye are also on permanent display in the Heritage Room. A clock, a typewriter, and several books that belonged to Northrop Frye's family were donated by Earl Johnson, a neighbour of the Frye family. A desk, numerous portraits and caricatures of Frye, as well as a large and important collection of works by and about Frye were donated to the library by the American professor and renowned Frye scholar, Robert D. Denham.

Programs 
 Programs for children including Babies in the Library, Toddlertime, Storytime, Crafternoon, Book Clubs, Family Movie Day and Science/STEAM programs.
 Programs for Young Adults including a monthly Anime and Manga club, and monthly programs on a variety of different themes including gaming in the library and different crafts.
 Programs for adults including computer courses, one-one-one email tutorials and other information literacy courses such as genealogy research online, newspapers online, shopping online and social networking. There are also author tours, learning seminars, and a variety of other programs for adults and seniors.
 Monthly art openings introduce new artists exhibiting at the  Moncton Public Library art gallery.
 Services for Patrons with print disabilities including an adaptive computer workstation with SystemAccess, Zoomtext, OpenBook and Kurzweil 3000

Fundraising 

The Magnum Opus Gala and Art Auction was the Moncton Public Library's main fundraising event from 2007 to 2010. Taking place in October the art auction was an opportunity to raise funds for improvement of library collections, but also offered "artists across Atlantic Canada the opportunity to get exposure for their work and the chance to sell a piece of their art."

External links 
 New Brunswick Public Library Service
 Moncton Public Library
 Bibliothèque publique de Moncton
 Service Model for Patrons with Print Disabilities
 Electronic Library New Brunswick

References

Public libraries in New Brunswick
Culture of Moncton
Buildings and structures in Moncton
Education in Moncton
Tourist attractions in Moncton
Libraries established in 1913
1913 establishments in Canada